Chung Seok-Keun  (born November 25, 1977) is a South Korean football player who is playing for National League side Incheon Korail. Jung has played in the K-League for two sides, making his professional debut for Busan I'cons in 2000 before joining Gwangju Sangmu Phoenix (army) for the 2002 season. He signed for Incheon Korail in 2004, and was voted league MVP in 2005 as Incheon Korail lifted the K2 League championship. He rejoined Incheon Korail in mid-2008.

Club career 
2000-2001 Busan I'Cons
2002-2003 Gwangju Sangmu Phoenix - Military service
2004-2005 Incheon Korail
2008–2010 Incheon Korail

External links
 
 National League Player Record - 정석근 
 

1977 births
Living people
Association football forwards
South Korean footballers
Busan IPark players
Gimcheon Sangmu FC players
K League 1 players
Korea National League players